Mikko Keskinarkaus (born 29 June 1979) is a Finnish skier. He competed in the Nordic combined event at the 2002 Winter Olympics.

References

External links
 

1979 births
Living people
Finnish male Nordic combined skiers
Olympic Nordic combined skiers of Finland
Nordic combined skiers at the 2002 Winter Olympics
People from Rovaniemi
Sportspeople from Lapland (Finland)